Flag captain was in the Swedish Navy a captain or commander who served as deputy to a fleet commander. During the 1900s, the flag captain served as chief of staff of Flaggen, the staff of the Chief of the Coastal Fleet.

History
The flag captain was in the Swedish Navy a naval officer, of the rank of captain or commander, who was posted as chief of staff to a fleet commander. If he was a flag officer, the flag captain carried, as command flag, the standard prescribed for "squadron commander", otherwise he carried the broad pennant (galjadett) intended for "department commander". According to the regulations in force before 1875, the flag captain was an officer of the rank of flag officer or regimental officer, commanded to assist the commander of a fleet of at least six ships of the line, frigates or battalions of archipelago ships.

Between 1904 and 2000, the flag captain served as chief of staff of Flaggen, the staff of the Chief of the Coastal Fleet.

Flag captains (1902–2000)

1902–1903: Lieutenant commander Sten Ankarcrona
1904–1907: Commander Herman Wrangel
1907–1907: Captain Carl August Ehrensvärd
1907–1909: Commander Gustaf af Klint
1909–1915: Commander Henning von Krusenstierna
1914–1915: Lieutenant commander Ulf Carl Knutsson Sparre (acting)
1915–1918: Captain Carl Alarik Wachtmeister
1918–1919: Lieutenant commander Henrik Gisiko 
1920–1923: Captain Gustaf Starck
1923–1925: Captain Charles de Champs
1925–1930: Captain Claës Lindsström
1930–1931: Captain Fabian Tamm
1932–1933: Captain Hans Simonsson
1933–1936: Captain Gösta Ehrensvärd
1937–1939: Captain Yngve Ekstrand
1939–1941: Captain Helge Strömbäck
1941–1943: Captain Erik Anderberg
1943–1945: Captain Erik Samuelson
1946–1948: Captain John Wirström
1948–1950: –
1950–1951: Captain Erik af Klint
1951–1953: Captain Bertil Berthelsson
1953–1956: Captain Einar Blidberg
1957–1959: Captain Åke Lindemalm
1959–1964: Captain Magnus Starck
1964–1966: Captain Nils-Erik Ödman
1966–1971: Captain Alf Berggren
1971–1973: Captain Göte Blom
1973–1973: Commander Sigurd Håkansson
1973–1978: Captain Åke Johnson
1978–1980: Captain Lennart Forsman
1980–1980: Captain Bengt O'Konor
1980–1982: Captain Holger Grenstad
1982–1983: Captain Johan Bring
1983–1985: Captain Claes Tornberg
1985–1986: Captain Gustaf Taube
1986–1988: Captain Bengt Uggla
1988–1989: Captain Frank Rosenius
1989–1992: Captain Emil Svensson
1992–1994: Captain Christer Hägg
1994–1996: Captain Olof Jonsson
1996–1998: Captain Anders Stävberg

References

Military appointments of Sweden
Swedish Navy